The Fayette Safety Vault and Trust Company Building in Lexington, Kentucky, is a commercial building designed by Herman L. Rowe and constructed in 1890. The stone facade was described as "a strange but compelling mixture of Italianate, Neo-Greek, Gothic, and Romanesque motifs," and "not excelled in appearance by any building in Kentucky." It was added to the National Register of Historic Places in 1980.

The building was constructed for the Fayette Safety Vault and Trust Company, organized in 1890 and absorbed by the larger Security Trust and Safety Vault Company in 1892. An early tenant of the building was Lexington's Moving Picture Theatorium.

Architect Herman L. Rowe also designed Lexington's Carnegie library in the Gratz Park Historic District and Argyle Hall at the former Campbell–Hagerman College. He was the supervising architect for the Lexington Opera House, designed by Oscar Cobb and constructed in 1887. The Opera House and Yates Bookshop Building were listed on the National Register of Historic Places in 1975.

References

External links

National Register of Historic Places in Lexington, Kentucky
Gothic Revival architecture in Kentucky
Victorian architecture in Kentucky
Buildings and structures completed in 1890
1890 establishments in Kentucky
Commercial buildings on the National Register of Historic Places in Kentucky
Individually listed contributing properties to historic districts on the National Register in Kentucky